Hajar Juni Samma is a 2019 Nepali romantic-drama, directed by Bikash Raj Acharya. The film is produced by Bishal Chambling under the banner of Mata Pathivara Films. Hajar Juni Samma is about a retired singer seeking to find a match for his son. The film stars Aryan Sigdel, Priyanka Karki, Sanchita Luitel, Swastima Khadka, Salon Basnet, Shivahari Paudel, Anubhav Regmi.

Plot 
Siddhanth (Aryan Sigdel) is a retired singer who owns a guitar shop. He has two adopted sons Nishant (Salon Basnet) and Atharba (Akhilesh Pradhan). Siddhanth wants to find a match for his son Atharba.

Cast 
 Aryan Sigdel as Siddhanth
 Priyanka Karki as Maya
 Sanchita Luitel
 Swastima Khadka as Avantika
 Salon Basnet as Nishant
 Akhilesh Pradhan as Atharba
 Shivahari Paudel
 Anubhav Regmi

Soundtrack

Production 
Hajar Juni Samma's song "MG Rodaima" was entirely in Gangtok, capital of Sikkim, mostly around the MG Marg.

Release and reception 
Sunny Mahat of The Annapurna Express wrote, "Now this is a movie you’d want to watch with your female friends, just to see them cringe at the creepy old man trying to find a match for his son". Abhimanyu Dixit of The Kathmandu Post, wrote "But Chamling's [producer] efforts have been wasted because the delivery is lazy. So is the screenplay and dialogue, written by director Bikash Raj Acharya and Samipya Timilsina". Rupak Risal of Moviemanu praised the actors' performance in the film.

References 

2019 films
Nepalese romantic comedy films
Films shot in Pokhara
Nepalese coming-of-age films
Films shot in Sikkim